Dvůr Králové nad Labem is a town in Trutnov District in the Hradec Králové Region of the Czech Republic. It has about 15,000 inhabitants. It lies in the Elbe river valley. Dvůr Králové nad Labem is known for the Safari Park Dvůr Králové, one of the largest zoos in the country. The town centre is well preserved and is protected by law as an urban monument zone.

Administrative parts

Villages of Lipnice, Verdek, Zboží, Žireč and Žirecká Podstráň are administrative parts of Dvůr Králové nad Labem.

Etymology
The town's name means "Queen consort's court on the Elbe". It refers to its history, when it was owned by Bohemian queens, and geographical location. It was originally named Dvůr; the name appeared as Curia in Latin in 1270, as Hof in German  in 1318, and then as Dwuor in Old Czech in 1421.

Geography
It lies mostly in the eastern tip of the Jičín Uplands, the northern part of the municipal territory extends into the Giant Mountains Foothills. The town is situated on both banks of the Elbe River, in the river valley.

History
The first written mention of Dvůr Králové nad Labem is from 1270. A settlement with a small church was founded as guard point on a military trail to Silesia probably in the second half of the 12th century. The settlement began to expand with colonization of mostly German people. It is unknown when it was promoted to a town and became a property of the king.

In the 14th century, the town was fortified. In 1392, King Wenceslaus IV signed the town over to his wife, Queen Sophia of Bavaria. Since then, it was a dowry town and called Dvůr Králové. In 1421, the town surrendered without a fight to the moderate wing of the Hussites. In 1436, it became again a dowry town managed by Queen Barbara of Cilli.

During the Thirty Years' War, Dvůr Králové was repeatedly looted and damaged, and experienced decline. It was also marked by War of the Austrian Succession, Seven Years' War and Austro-Prussian War. The town however recovered thanks to textile crafts (weaving and dyeing), and became regional centre of trade and crafts. The industry further developed after the railway was built in 1858, the road network was improved, and the Elbe became navigable. In the 1880s, the first textile factories were established.

Until 1918, the town was part of the Austrian monarchy (Austria side after the compromise of 1867), head of the Königshof an der Elbe – Dvůr Králové nad Labem District, one of the 94 Bezirkshauptmannschaften in Bohemia.

After the World War II, the German inhabitants were expelled.

Manuscript affair
On 16 September 1817 Václav Hanka allegedly discovered a manuscript appearing to be from the 13th century in the tower of a local church. The Manuscript of Dvůr Kralové, probably in fact created by Hanka, was intended to help Czech patriots in the struggle against German culture. Although it has been proved to be most likely a counterfeit, it became an important part of the country's history.

Demographics

Economy
The largest employer based in Dvůr Králové nad Labem is JUTA a. s. The company was founded here in 1946 as jute and hemp processor and followed up on tradition of textile industry. Today it focuses on technical fabrics and synthetic products.

Sights

The town is known for Safari Park Dvůr Králové with its African safari theme. Visitors may admire over 2,300 animals of 500 species of mostly African hoofstock. It has a reputation of one of the most successful breeders of many endangered species.

Notable is the Church of Saint John the Baptist, which is a national monument. it was built in the Gothic style on the site of the original Romanesque church. The tower was added in 1644 and its present appearance is from the reconstructions in the 1890s.

The historic core is formed by T. G. Masaryka Square. Its main landmark is the Renaissance Old Town Hall. It was built in 1833, after the original building from 1572 burned down in 1790. It has arcades and decorative façade. Other sights of the square include Art Nouveau savings bank from 1909–1910, Baroque marian column from 1754, and a fountain from 1857.

In the town part of Žireč there is an old residence of the Jesuits.

Notable people

Ferdinand Albin Pax (1858–1942), botanist, acted in Germany
Otto Gutfreund (1889–1927), Jewish sculptor
Karl Freund (1890–1969), Jewish cameraman of the silent film era
Rudolf Antonín Dvorský (1899–1966), musician, songwriter
Jan Zdeněk Bartoš (1908–1981), composer
Ladislav Lubina (1967–2021), ice hockey player and coach
Martin Šonka (born 1978), aerobatics and fighter pilot
Gabriela Martinovová (born 1981), alpine skier
Karolína Grohová (born 1990), cross-country skier
Josef Král (born 1990), racing driver

Twin towns – sister cities

Dvůr Králové nad Labem is twinned with:
 Kamienna Góra, Poland
 Piegaro, Italy
 Verneuil-en-Halatte, France

References

External links

Official tourist portal
Safari Park Dvůr Králové
Regional news

Virtual show

Cities and towns in the Czech Republic
Populated places in Trutnov District
Populated riverside places in the Czech Republic
Populated places on the Elbe